Elaphria agrotina is a moth of the family Noctuidae first described by Achille Guenée in 1852. It is found from North America (including Maryland, Virginia, Kentucky, Florida and Texas), through Central America, the Antilles and Cuba to Brazil and Argentina.

The wingspan is about 18 mm.

The larvae feed on Phaseolus species.

References

Caradrinini
Moths of North America
Moths of the Caribbean
Moths of Central America
Moths of South America
Moths of Cuba
Lepidoptera of Brazil
Lepidoptera of Jamaica
Moths described in 1852